Solomon Davin of Rodez was a Jewish astronomer who lived in the second half of the fourteenth century. He was a disciple of Immanuel Bonfils in Orange. 

He translated from Latin into Hebrew, under the title Sefer mishpete ha-kokhavim, Abu al-Ḥasan Ali ibn Abi Rijal's astronomical and astrological work Kitab al-bari' fi ahkam an-nujum ('The Brilliant Book on the Judgments of the Stars'). Davin's translation, attested in three manuscripts, is accompanied by glosses, which begin with the abbreviated form of his name— ('And said Solomon Davin, the disciple, the translator'). Davin also translated the astronomical tables of Paris.

References
 

14th-century astronomers
14th-century French Jews
14th-century French scientists
Latin–Hebrew translators
Medieval Jewish astronomers
People from Rodez